The Lo Nuestro Award for New Rock Artist of the Year is an honor presented annually by American network Univision. The Lo Nuestro Awards have been held since 1989 to recognize the most talented performers of Latin music. The nominees and winners were originally selected by a voting poll conducted among program directors of Spanish-language radio stations in the United States and also based on chart performance on Billboard Latin music charts, with the results tabulated and certified by the accounting firm Arthur Andersen. Starting from 2004, the winners are selected by the audience through an online survey. The trophy is shaped in the form of a treble clef.

The award was first presented in every field awarded on the Lo Nuestro Awards: Pop, Tropical, Regional Mexican and, for one time only, Rock/Alternative; In 2004, the nominees included Puerto-Rican ensemble Circo, Mexican group Inspector, Spanish R&B trio Las Niñas, Argentinian band La Zurda, and Mexican solo singers Jorge Correa, Natalia Lafourcade, and Alessandra Rosaldo; with Rosaldo receiving the award.

Winners and nominees

Listed below are the winners of the award for each year, as well as the other nominees.

See also
 Grammy Award for Best New Artist
 Latin Grammy Award for Best New Artist

References

Music awards for breakthrough artist
Rock music awards
Latin rock albums
Rock New Artist of the Year
Awards established in 2004
Awards disestablished in 2004